Liu Yujian (born 31 January 1980) is a Chinese former football player.

Club career
Liu Yujian was promoted to first team squad of Dalian Wanda in 1997. He represented China U-20 in the 1998 AFC Youth Championship. His position was replaced since Adilson's arrival, and sought for transfer in 2002.

In 2002, he moved to Dalian Sidelong.

In 2003, he followed his manager Xu Hong and moved to Sichuan First City. In 2004, during a match against Beijing Guoan, Sui Dongliang's violent tackle caused serious tibia-fibula fracture on his right leg. He was unable to play for an entire year, and struggled during the recovery.

In 2006, he joined Changchun Yatai shortly.

In 2008, he returned to Dalian Shide.

In 2010, he joined the newly established Dalian Aerbin. Since 2012, he has been working as youth team manager after his teirement at Dalian Aerbin. He managed Dalian Yifang U-19 team since 2019, and gradually promoted to the U-21 team.

In 2022, Dalian Pro U-21 team would compete as an independent football club named Dalian Jinshiwan, and Liu remained the manager of the team.

References

External links
 

1980 births
Living people
Chinese footballers
Footballers from Dalian
Dalian Shide F.C. players
Changchun Yatai F.C. players
Chinese Super League players
China League One players
Association football defenders